Savills plc is a British real estate services company based in London. It is listed on the London Stock Exchange and is a constituent of the FTSE 250 Index.

History
The business was established by Alfred Savill (1829–1905) in 1855 in London. By the time of Alfred Savill's death in 1905 his sons Alfred, Edwin and Norman were established in partnership. In the 1920s the firm moved to Lincoln's Inn Fields. During the Second World War Norman Savill went to Wimborne in Dorset, taking vital records with him. The remaining partners stayed at Lincoln's Inn Field. By the 1970s, the firm was re-branded as Savills.  The firm was incorporated as a limited company in 1987 and was listed on the London Stock Exchange in 1988.

In 1997 Savills merged with First Pacific Davies in Asia. In 1998 it bought majority stakes in the German, French and Spanish arms of Weatherall, Green & Smith.  In June 2015 it completed the acquisition of Smiths Gore, provider of rural and residential property services in the UK. In June 2016, Savills plc announced its proprietary investment subsidiary, Grosvenor Hill Ventures, had acquired a minority stake in YOPA Property Ltd, a UK-based online hybrid estate agent.

Savills announced in August 2016 that it had acquired GBR Phoenix Beard, a Midlands-based commercial property consultancy, strengthening its UK real estate services. Expansion continued in July 2017, with the acquisition of Larry Smith Italia, a leading commercial management and leasing business in Italy. The company's European operations grew further in December 2017 when Savills acquired Aguirre Newman S.A., the leading independent Spanish and Portuguese real estate advisory; the newly combined business was rebranded as Savills Aguirre Newman in January 2018.

Operations
The company provides property consulting services from 600 owned and associate offices, employing some 39,000 people in over 70 countries throughout the Americas, Europe, Asia Pacific.

See also
CBRE Group
Jones Lang LaSalle
Colliers International
Knight Frank
DTZ
CresaPartners
Foxtons

References

Further reading

Property companies based in London
Companies listed on the London Stock Exchange
Real estate companies established in 1855
Property services companies of the United Kingdom
1855 establishments in England